Edwin Carroll McLogan (March 31, 1889 – October 12, 1949) was a Michigan politician.

Early life

Political life
The Flint City Commission selected him as mayor in 1944 and selected him again for another year.

Post-political life

References

Mayors of Flint, Michigan
1889 births
1949 deaths
Politicians from Chicago
20th-century American politicians